Barantola is a moth genus of the family Depressariidae.

Species
 Barantola panarista (Turner, 1917)
 Barantola pulcherrima Walker, 1864

References

Depressariinae
Moth genera